was a province of Japan in the area of Japan that is today Yamanashi Prefecture. Kai bordered on Sagami, Suruga, Shinano and Musashi Provinces. The origin of its name is uncertain. It lies in central Honshū, west of Tokyo, in a landlocked mountainous region that includes Mount Fuji along its border with modern Shizuoka Prefecture.

History
Kai was one of the original provinces of Japan established in the Nara period under the Taihō Code. The original capital of the province was located in what is now Fuefuki. Under the Engishiki classification system, Kai was ranked as a "superior country" (上国) in terms of importance, and one of the 16 "middle countries" (中国) in terms of distance from the capital. Although not directly on the Tōkaidō, it was also included as one of the Tōkaidō provinces.

Numerous remains from the Kofun period have been found in Kai. During the Heian period, the area came under the control of the Kai Genji, who controlled the province throughout the Kamakura period. During the Sengoku period, a branch of the clan, the Takeda clan rose to prominence. The warlord Takeda Shingen, ruled Kai from his stronghold at Kōfu and expanded the holdings of the clan to include Shinano and Suruga Provinces, and engaged in constant warfare against the Uesugi clan in Echigo Province. After the Takeda were defeated by a coalition led by Oda Nobunaga and Tokugawa Ieyasu, Kai Province came briefly under the rule of Nobunaga’s retainer Kawajiri Hidetaka. After Nobunaga’s assassination, the province was contested between Tokugawa Ieyasu and the Go-Hōjō clan based in Odawara. However, after the destruction of the Go-Hōjō by Toyotomi Hideyoshi in 1590, the province was ruled by a succession of Toyotomi loyalists.

With the establishment of the Tokugawa shogunate, Kai was regarded as strategically important to the defense of Edo due to its position between the Tōkaidō and Nakasendō highways, which were connected through Kai Province by the Kōshū Kaidō. Kai Province was entrusted briefly to Tokugawa clan members or the highly trusted Yanagisawa clan from 1705-1724 as Kōfu Domain, but for the most part was retained as tenryō territory ruled directly by the shogunate through a succession of hatamoto-class daikan.

After the Meiji Restoration, Kai province was renamed Kōfu Prefecture in 1869. With the abolition of the han system in 1871, it was renamed Yamanashi Prefecture.

Historical districts
Kai was traditionally divided into four districts:
 Yamanashi Prefecture
 Koma District (巨摩郡)
 Kitakoma District (北巨摩郡) - dissolved
 Minamikoma District (南巨摩郡)
 Nakakoma District (中巨摩郡)
 Tsuru District (都留郡)
 Kitatsuru District (北都留郡)
 Minamitsuru District (南都留郡)
 Yamanashi District (山梨郡)
 Higashiyamanashi District (東山梨郡) - dissolved
 Nishiyamanashi District (西山梨郡) - dissolved
 Yatsushiro District (八代郡)
 Higashiyatsushiro District (東八代郡) - dissolved
 Nishiyatsushiro District (西八代郡)

Highways
Nakasendō – connecting Edo with Kyoto
Kōshū Kaidō – connecting Edo with Shimosuwa on the Nakasendo

See also
 Kōfu Domain

References

External links

 Murdoch's map of provinces, 1903

 
Former provinces of Japan
History of Yamanashi Prefecture
1871 disestablishments in Japan
States and territories disestablished in 1871